Eucalyptus conveniens is a species of small mallee or shrub that is endemic to a small area on the west coast of Western Australia. It has smooth bark, sometimes with a short stocking of rough bark near its base, lance-shaped to egg-shaped or elliptic adult leaves, flowers buds in groups of three, whitish flowers and glaucous, barrel-shaped fruit.

Description
The bark is smooth greyish over green but there is sometimes a stocking of rough, ribbony bark near the base of the trunk. The floral cup is more or less square in cross-section with narrow wings on the corners and a rounded operculum. Flowering occurs in January and February and the flowers are whitish.

Taxonomy and naming
Eucalyptus conveniens was first formally described in 1998 by Lawrie Johnson and Ken Hill and the description was published in the journal Telopea. The specific epithet (conveniens) is a Latin word meaning "fit", "suitable" or "accordant", referring to "its somewhat intermediate position between E. tetragona and E. gittinsii".

Distribution and habitat
This eucalypt is common in mallee heath on sandplains between Mount Adams and Badgingarra.

Conservation status
Eucalyptus conveniens is classified as "not threatened" by the Western Australian Government Department of Parks and Wildlife.

See also
List of Eucalyptus species

References

Eucalypts of Western Australia
conveniens
Myrtales of Australia
Plants described in 1998
Taxa named by Lawrence Alexander Sidney Johnson
Taxa named by Ken Hill (botanist)